Youri Loen (born 27 January 1991) is a Dutch professional footballer who plays as a midfielder for Maltese club Mosta.

Career
Born in Nijmegen, after playing with amateur club SV Orion, Loen began his career with the youth team of hometown club NEC in 2001, and later played for Dordrecht, Sparta Rotterdam, Fortuna Sittard, FC Emmen and Almere City.

After two seasons with Almere City, in which he scored 8 goals and made 15 assists in 65 games, he was told he was no longer wanted by the club. He left the club at the end of June 2020, and returned to former club SV Orion in July 2020, as well as a second amateur club Brakkenstein, to train in order to maintain fitness.

Later that month he began training with TOP Oss. He remained training with TOP Oss in October 2020, although the club said they would not be signing him to a contract. Later that month he signed for Greek club Doxa Drama.

On 26 January 2021, Loen signed for Finnish club FC Haka.

On 19 January 2022, he joined Mosta in Malta.

References

1991 births
Living people
Footballers from Nijmegen
Dutch footballers
SV Orion players
NEC Nijmegen players
FC Dordrecht players
Sparta Rotterdam players
Fortuna Sittard players
FC Emmen players
Almere City FC players
Doxa Drama F.C. players
FC Haka players
Mosta F.C. players
Eredivisie players
Eerste Divisie players
Association football midfielders
Dutch expatriate footballers
Expatriate footballers in Greece
Dutch expatriate sportspeople in Greece
Expatriate footballers in Finland
Dutch expatriate sportspeople in Finland
Expatriate footballers in Malta
Dutch expatriate sportspeople in Malta